Sivanath Sastri College is an undergraduate college for women in Kolkata, India, and is popularly referred to as South City Morning. It is affiliated with the University of Calcutta. The name commemorates the legacy of Brahmo social reformer Sivanath Sastri. It shares premises with Heramba Chandra College (popularly known as South City Day) and Prafulla Chandra College (popularly known as South City Evening).

Library

The library was founded on the ideals of the nineteenth century Brahmo educational movement with its focus on providing quality education to women as pioneered by Pandit Sivanath Sastri. Today even though it is hard-pressed for space and lacks desired manpower, the Sivanath Sastri college library continues with its mission to help the community to grow.

The collection

The library has a collection of more than 39,000 volumes which also include a small collection of conventional reference books. The library functions as a consortium of five separate units:  the Central library, the Honours Seminar library, the Staff-room library, the Departmental library of Geography and the Departmental library of Botany. While all accredited users may access the Central library, access to the Honours Seminar library is restricted to the Honours students and teachers. The staffroom library is for class room reference, while the departmental libraries are for use by the teachers and the students of the respective departments. Apart from the books acquired under college grant and UGC grant there is a small collection of books donated by the users and well wishers named "Prafulla Chandra Roy Text Book Library".

Facilities provided

The central library provides a large reading room capable of accommodating more than 70 readers at a time. Other facilities include the UGC book bank for needy students, access to the internet is also provided to the users at the central library. Readers have access to UGC INFLIBNET's N-LIST e-resource consortia for full text journals and e-books.

Computerization of the library

Computerized automation of the library started in 2004 using the WinISIS software. Responding to changes in technology, the library today uses the open source library management software Koha to meet its automation needs. The online public access catalog (OPAC) is available and can be accessed at http://ssclib-opac.l2c2.co.in/

Accreditation
Sivanath Sastri College is recognized by the University Grants Commission (UGC).
The college is also accredited by National Assessment and Accreditation Council (NAAC).

Notable alumni
Indrani Dutta
Koneenica Banerjee

See also 
List of colleges affiliated to the University of Calcutta
Education in India
Education in West Bengal

References

External links
 Official website

Universities and colleges in Kolkata
Universities and colleges affiliated with the Brahmo Samaj
University of Calcutta affiliates
Women's universities and colleges in West Bengal
1961 establishments in West Bengal
Educational institutions established in 1961